Anthony David Hawthorn Smith (born 13 March 1967) is an Australian politician who was the 30th Speaker of the House of Representatives. He was a Liberal Party Member of the House of Representatives from 2001 to 2022, representing the Division of Casey in Victoria.

Early life and education

Smith was born in Melbourne, to parents Alan Smith, a chemistry teacher, and Noel Smith, a medical secretary. Tony was the youngest child, with two older sisters: Christine (born 1960) and Heather (born 1962). He was educated first at Kerrimuir Primary School in Box Hill North before attending Carey Baptist Grammar School in Kew. He studied Commerce and Arts (Hons) at The University of Melbourne.  He was president of the Melbourne University Liberal Club, and is now an honorary life member.

Political career
After completing his education, Smith was a research assistant at the Institute of Public Affairs, a conservative think-tank, before becoming first a media adviser and then a senior political adviser to Peter Costello, the then-Deputy Leader of the Liberal Party and Treasurer.

In parliament
On 23 January 2007, Smith was appointed Parliamentary Secretary to the Prime Minister, John Howard. He managed to hold his seat of Casey by a considerable margin at the federal election in November of that year, although the Liberal-National Coalition was defeated. On 22 September 2008, Smith was appointed Shadow Assistant Treasurer by Opposition Leader Malcolm Turnbull. Smith had previously been Shadow Minister for Education, Apprenticeships and Training. He was appointed Shadow Minister for Communications in a reshuffle which took place on 8 December 2009.

When Malcolm Turnbull's hold on the Liberal leadership became terminal, it was speculated that Smith was part of a "two-Tony" ticket in which Smith would be the running mate of Tony Abbott in a leadership challenge. Although Abbott successfully challenged Turnbull for the Liberal leadership on 1 December 2009, Smith was not Abbott's running mate, and Julie Bishop remained deputy under Abbott.

Despite the speculation that they would make a leadership team in 2009, Abbott and Smith do not seem to be close as Abbott demoted Smith after the 2010 election. When Smith sought the speakership in 2015, it is understood that Abbott as Prime Minister backed rival contender Russell Broadbent as the Government's candidate for Speaker over Smith. In 2015, the Daily Telegraph reported that there was an "internal view" in the Liberal Party that Abbott blamed Smith for the Coalition's narrow loss at the 2010 election due to Smith's perceived mishandling of the Coalition's broadband policy when Shadow Communications Minister.

In the new Abbott shadow ministry announced after the August 2010 election, Smith was appointed Shadow Parliamentary Secretary for Tax Reform and Deputy chairman, Coalition Policy Development Committee.

He was interviewed extensively in the ABC documentary The Howard Years. On 14 July 2021 Smith issued a statement saying he would retire as Member for Casey at the end of the 46th Parliament.

Speaker of the House
Following the resignation of Bronwyn Bishop as Speaker of the House of Representatives in August 2015 over entitlement rorts dating back a decade, the Liberal Party nominated Smith as the party's candidate to replace Bishop. The House of Representatives elected Smith unopposed. He pledged to absent himself from the Liberal party room for the duration of his speakership to protect the neutrality of the chair. He also eschewed the traditional full attire of the Speaker, instead continuing to wear an ordinary business suit.

Smith was re-elected Speaker unopposed after the 2016 and 2019 federal elections. He was the first Speaker to be elected unopposed on three occasions since Frederick Holder, the inaugural holder of the position. Due to his upcoming retirement from parliament, Smith resigned as Speaker on 23 November 2021.

References

External links
Personal website
 The Hon Tony Smith MP, Official Parliament website biography. Retrieved August 2015

1967 births
Living people
Liberal Party of Australia members of the Parliament of Australia
Speakers of the Australian House of Representatives
Politicians from Melbourne
Members of the Australian House of Representatives
Members of the Australian House of Representatives for Casey
People educated at Carey Baptist Grammar School
University of Melbourne alumni
21st-century Australian politicians